Alfred Stansfield  (1871 – 5 February 1944) was a British-Canadian metallurgist and Birks Professor of Metallurgy at McGill University, Montreal, Canada (1901–36).

Early life 
Stansfield was born in Bradford, Yorkshire in 1872, the second son of Frederic and Mary Ellen Stansfield. His younger brother was the British physicist Herbert Stansfield (1872–1960). He was educated at the Royal College of Science, London and Royal College of Mines, London, graduating in 1891.

He was a Research Assistant in Sir William Roberts-Austen's laboratories at the Royal Mint between 1891 and 1898 and obtained his Bachelor of Science (BSc) and Doctor of Science (DSc) degrees at the University of London. He supervised the Metallurgical Laboratories at the Royal School of Mines from 1898 to 1901.

Career 

Stansfield was appointed Professor of Metallurgy at McGill University, Montreal in 1901, and later became Birks Professor of Metallurgy and Head of Department of Metallurgy in 1912. He also served as a Commissioner of the Pyx of the Royal Canadian Mint at Ottawa from 1911 to 1931.

His research focussed on pyrometry, the Solution Theory of Carburized Iron, the constitution of alloys, the burning of steel, smelting titaniferous ores of iron, electric smelting, graphical methods of teaching Thermochemistry and the investigation of metallurgical reactions at high temperatures. Consequently, he authored several reports for the Canadian government. He reported on the electric smelting of iron ores in Sweden in 1914, on Canadian magnesium production in 1915, and on the electric smelting of iron ores in British Columbia in 1918. In 1915, he was a Member of a Commission appointed by the Canadian Minister of Defence to investigate the feasibility of producing refined copper and zinc. Stansfield retired in 1936. He died in Montreal, Canada, on 5 February 1944.

Honours 
Stansfield was an Associate of the Royal School of Mines (ARSM) and was awarded the Plummer Medal by the Engineering Institute of Canada in 1921. He served as Vice-President of the American Electrochemical Society from 1928 and was elected a Fellow of the Royal Society of Canada (FRSC).

Family 
Stansfield married, in 1905, Ethel Ernestine Grubb (1877–1942), the daughter of F. E. Grubb of Cahir Abbey, Tipperary, and Berkeley, California. They had one daughter. Ethel's sister, Edith Grubb, married Alfred's brother Herbert Stansfield.

Select Publications

References 

1871 births
1944 deaths
British metallurgists
Alumni of the Royal College of Science
McGill University people